Confessions is the sixth studio album by the American hard rock band Buckcherry. The album was released on February 19, 2013. It is the last Buckcherry album to feature the 15-era lineup, as bassist Jimmy Ashhurst departed the group later in 2013. Additionally, all other members of this lineup other than vocalist Josh Todd and guitarist Stevie D left by the end of 2017 shortly after the release of the band’s follow-up album Rock 'n' Roll.

Seven of the tracks on the album are named after the seven deadly sins.

Artwork
Before posting the official cover art on January 25, 2013, Buckcherry also posted artwork for an outer cover, they described as a "...book "cover" - and then when it's opened you'll get the true cover of the album itself." The day after, the band posted a picture of the official artwork, stating "We wanted our album cover artwork to be symbolic and encompass the subject matter of the record in an image that's cool enough to be tattooed. Hope you like it."

Commercial performance
The album debuted at No. 20 on Billboard 200, as well as No. 1 on the Hard Rock Albums chart, with 18,000 copies sold in its first week. The album has sold 55,000 copies in the U.S. as of August 2015.

Track listing

Personnel
Josh Todd – lead vocals
Keith Nelson – lead guitar, backing vocals
Stevie D. – rhythm guitar, backing vocals
Jimmy "Two Fingers" Ashhurst – bass guitar, backing vocals
Xavier Muriel – drums, percussion

Charts

References

Buckcherry albums
2013 albums
Eleven Seven Label Group albums
Seven deadly sins in popular culture